Route 2 is a national route of Uruguay. In 1983, it was assigned the name Grito de Asencio. It connects Fray Bentos with Rosario.

References

Roads in Uruguay